The Men's Slalom in the 2020 FIS Alpine Ski World Cup involved only nine events, as the final three scheduled slaloms of the season were cancelled. 

After the retirement of Marcel Hirscher, who had won the slalom discipline in six of the prior seven seasons, the strong favorite for the discipline championship was 2016 winner Henrik Kristoffersen of Norway (the only prior champion still active).  Kristoffersen, in fact, had gotten off to a huge lead over the field in the middle of the season. However, after failing to finish a slalom in Chamonix, Kristoffersen was clinging to just a two-point lead in this discipline over Clément Noël of France (who won the race), with three races still remaining on the schedule. But then a race in Japan was canceled due to high winds, followed by the season finale scheduled for Cortina d'Ampezzo being cancelled by the COVID-19 pandemic, and finally, the race scheduled in Kranjska Gora was also cancelled by the pandemic.

The cancellations handed the season title in slalom (as well as the title in giant slalom) to Kristoffersen without the expected showdown.

Standings 

DNQ = Did Not Qualify for run 2
DNF1 = Did Not Finish run 1
DNF2 = Did Not Finish run 2

Updated at 21 March 2020 after all events.

See also
 2020 Alpine Skiing World Cup – Men's summary rankings
 2020 Alpine Skiing World Cup – Men's Overall
 2020 Alpine Skiing World Cup – Men's Downhill
 2020 Alpine Skiing World Cup – Men's Super-G
 2020 Alpine Skiing World Cup – Men's Giant Slalom
 2020 Alpine Skiing World Cup – Men's Combined
 2020 Alpine Skiing World Cup – Men's Parallel
 World Cup scoring system

References

External links
 Alpine Skiing at FIS website

Men's Slalom
FIS Alpine Ski World Cup slalom men's discipline titles